The Nightly Show is a British late-night entertainment and chat show hosted by various presenters each week, which premiered on 27 February 2017 and ended on 23 April 2017. The show aired on ITV at 10:00 pm on Monday to Friday evenings. Each episode was taped at the Cochrane Theatre in London at 6:00 pm, every weekday, four hours before that night's episode was scheduled to air on ITV.

Before the show's premiere, non-broadcast pilot episodes were filmed in December 2016 and February 2017 to test filming equipment, audience interaction and the show's set design.

The main purpose of The Nightly Show was to serve as a British response to the popularity of late-night television shows present in the United States, such as Jimmy Kimmel Live!,  The Late Show with Stephen Colbert, The Late Late Show with James Corden and The Tonight Show Starring Jimmy Fallon.

Due to underperforming viewing figures and poor critical reception, ITV decided not to renew the show for a second series.

Format
ITV said the series would feature a "high tempo mixture of topical monologue, studio games, celebrity guests, experts and VTs (pre-recorded items)". It has been described by the British media as a cross between Ant & Dec's Saturday Night Takeaway and The Late Late Show with James Corden.

Presenters

Episodes

Series 1 (2017)
The episode due to air on Wednesday 22 March 2017 was cancelled due to ongoing ITV News coverage of the Westminster attack, reducing the series episode count to 39. The post-midnight repeat was replaced by a repeat of Countrywise.

On Monday 27 March 2017, ITV lost signal before going into the second part of the episode. The episode finished three minutes later than usual.

On Tuesday 18 April 2017, the show was transmitted late at 11.00 pm because of extended news coverage resulting from the announcement of the UK general election which replaced the regular 10:00 pm slot.
 

  McCall's week also featured DJ 'Fat Tony' as the house DJ.
  O'Leary's weeks also featured Joe Thompson as the house pianist.
  Walsh's week also featured Stevie Sidwell and the West End All Stars as the house band, Joe Pasquale as the 'roving reporter' and Redd Pepper as the announcer. 
  Manford's week also featured Stevie Sidwell and The Nightly Show All Stars as the house band and Ellie Taylor as the announcer.

Weekly average viewing figures

The average per show over all eight weeks was 1.38 million.

Reception
Upon the show's debut, it received a negative critical reception from many, with attacks on the show via Twitter, mainly due to the show being branded by some viewers as unfunny and a "rip-off" of the format used heavily in the United States, as well as the push back of the airing of ITV News at Ten to 10:30 pm. According to an inside source from ITV, The Nightly Show could be moved to airing after ITV News at Ten if viewing figures continue to decline. It was reported that Walliams would be paid £250,000 for his week's work. Mel and Sue were planned to host one of the weeks, but cited a 'busy schedule' as the reason for their cancellation.

ITV stated that the show would not return in 2018 due to low viewing figures.

References

External links

The Nightly Show on Twitter
The Nightly Show on YouTube

2017 British television series debuts
2017 British television series endings
2010s British comedy television series
2010s British television talk shows
English-language television shows
ITV comedy
ITV talk shows
Television series by ITV Studios